Behafarid Ghafarian (‎; born: 20 January 1994) is an Iranian actress. Her most noted work is playing the protagonist in Sophie & The Mad (2017). She is also known for work on the stage, particularly for playing “Leila Arash” in “Fe’l” , a play written and directed by Mohammad Rezaee Raad.

Filmography

Theatre

References

External links

1994 births
Living people
People from Tehran
Actresses from Tehran
Iranian film actresses
Iranian stage actresses
Soore University alumni
21st-century Iranian actresses